The Penobscot Block is a complex of office towers centered on the 45-story Penobscot Building at the corner of Griswold Street and West Fort Street in Downtown Detroit, Michigan. The buildings on the block are named for the Penobscot, a Native American tribe from Maine.

Buildings
The block is occupied by four major buildings: 
Penobscot Building (1905) (1905, northwest corner along Shelby Street and West Fort Street) (13 story oldest of the three).
Penobscot Building (1928, northeast corner, along Griswold Street and West Fort Street) (45-story youngest of the three).
Penobscot Building Annex (1922, southwest corner, along Shelby Street and West Congress Street).
Ford Building (southeast corner, along Griswold Street and West Congress Street).

The block is also bordered to the west (along Shelby Street) by the Savoyard Centre, previously known as the Peoples Savings Bank Building and 151 West Fort.

References
 
 Official Penobscot Building website

External links

Skyscraper office buildings in Detroit
Historic district contributing properties in Michigan
National Register of Historic Places in Detroit
Commercial buildings on the National Register of Historic Places in Michigan